Gothic Beauty is an American magazine established by editor Steven Holiday in the fall of 2000 after the success of the Internet social group of the same name. Gothic Beauty covers numerous aspects of underground culture including fashion, music, events and various forms of entertainment. Issues have included interviews with such Goth and Goth-friendly musicians as Alice Cooper, Diamanda Galás, KMFDM, Rasputina, Midnight Syndicate and Peter Murphy.  Also featured are interviews with fashion designers and other icons of the gothic and alternative subcultures, and myriad music reviews. Their main office is located in Portland, Oregon.

See also
Goth subculture

References

External links
 Official website

2000 establishments in Oregon
Cultural magazines published in the United States
Fashion magazines published in the United States
Music magazines published in the United States
Quarterly magazines published in the United States
Goth subculture
Gothic fashion
Magazines established in 2000
Magazines published in Portland, Oregon